Aliabadi is a surname. Notable people with the surname include:

Mohammad Aliabadi
Rahim Aliabadi (born 1943), Iranian sport wrestler
Reza Lak Aliabadi (born 1976), Iranian futsal player and manager
Roozbeh Aliabadi (born 1984), Political Advisor
Vahid Aliabadi (born 1990), Iranian footballer